Aris Zarifović (born 2 June 1988) is a Slovenian footballer who plays as a centre-back for Thai League 1 club PT Prachuap.

Club career
Zarifović played for the youth teams of Slovenian club ND Gorica before starting his professional career in the 2007–08 season, in which he played three matches for Gorica's first team in the Slovenian PrvaLiga. During his five years at the club, he appeared in 85 games, scoring six goals in the process.

In May 2012, he joined Olimpija Ljubljana, signing a four-year deal. In December 2015, his contract was extended until 2018, and in March 2018, it was extended again, this time until 2021. During his time at Olimpija, he played a total of 150 games across all competitions, scored eight goals, and won the PrvaLiga twice with the team.

In January 2019, Zarifović signed a contract with Thai League 1 side Samut Prakan City. After the club was relegated at the end of the 2021–22 season, he left Samut Prakan and joined PT Prachuap on a one-year deal.

Honours 
Olimpija Ljubljana
Slovenian PrvaLiga: 2015–16, 2017–18
Slovenian Football Cup: 2017–18

References

External links
Profile at NZS 
 
 

1988 births
Living people
People from Šempeter pri Gorici
Slovenian people of Bosniak descent
Slovenian people of Bosnia and Herzegovina descent
Slovenian footballers
Association football defenders
Slovenian expatriate footballers
ND Gorica players
NK Brda players
NK Olimpija Ljubljana (2005) players
Aris Zarifovic
Aris Zarifovic
Slovenian PrvaLiga players
Aris Zarifovic
Expatriate footballers in Thailand